Albert Mengue (born 18 April 1999) is a Cameroonian boxer. He competed in the men's welterweight event at the 2020 Summer Olympics.

References

External links
 

1999 births
Living people
Cameroonian male boxers
Olympic boxers of Cameroon
Boxers at the 2020 Summer Olympics
Place of birth missing (living people)
African Games competitors for Cameroon
Competitors at the 2019 African Games
21st-century Cameroonian people